Charleville-Mézières station (French: Gare de Charleville-Mézières) is a French railway station serving the town Charleville-Mézières, Ardennes department, northeastern France. TGV trains run to Paris as well as regular local services to Reims. Prior to the opening of the LGV Est between Paris and Strasbourg in 2007, two trains a day used to run in each direction between Gare de Lille Flandres and the Gare de Metz-Ville.

Services
The following train services serve the station as of 2017:

See also 

 List of SNCF stations in Grand Est

References

External links

 

Railway stations in Ardennes (department)
Railway stations in France opened in 1858